Brand Affinity Technologies (BAT) is a technology and marketing services company. It was founded by brother entrepreneurs Ryan Steelberg and Chad Steelberg. In October 2012, Brand Affinity Technologies acquired Printroom, a leading fan photography business.

References 

Advertising agencies of the United States